Natalie Anne Barr (born 19 March 1968) is an Australian journalist, news presenter and television presenter.

Barr is currently  co-host of the Seven Network's breakfast television program Sunrise alongside David Koch. She was previously news presenter on Sunrise.

Career
In July 2008, Barr began presenting Seven Early News alongside Mark Beretta at 5.30am, which leads into Sunrise where she is still the news presenter. Natalie also occasionally fills-in on Seven News Sydney.

Barr was a front-runner to co-host Sunday Night, a new current affairs show, however Chris Bath was appointed co-host with Mike Munro.

Natalie made a guest appearance on Home and Away 16 April 2018, appearing as herself reporting that missing girl Ava Gilbert.

In June 2020, it was announced Barr will host Sunrise with David Koch and Samantha Armytage on Monday and Friday respectively, after Armytage requested a reduced workload. However, due to dwindling ratings, Barr returned to presenting the news five days a week. In January 2021, Barr again became the permanent Friday co-presenter, this time with Matt Doran.

On 14 March 2021, Barr was appointed co-host of Sunrise after Samantha Armytage’s resignation.

Personal life
Barr was born in Bunbury, Western Australia and is married to Andrew (a television commercial editor). They have two sons.

References

External links

Sunrise
EntertainOZ celebrity speakers

1968 births
Living people
Seven News presenters
Australian television journalists
Journalists from Sydney
People from Bunbury, Western Australia
Curtin University alumni